Yousef Nouri (born 1961) is an Iranian politician who is the Minister of Education of Iran.

He is also the chairman of the board of trustees of the Student Organization Of Iran. He was suggested by Ebrahim Raisi, President of Iran, to the Iran parliament.

References 

21st-century Iranian politicians
1961 births
Living people